This is a listing of World War II battles occurring during the North African Campaign and is sometimes known as the "Desert War".  This includes the campaigns in Egypt and Libya (often referred to as the Western Desert campaign or the "Egypt-Libya Campaign") and those campaigns in Morocco, Algeria and Tunisia (usually referred to as the Tunisia campaign. This is not a comprehensive list of all engagements and generally does not cover isolated skirmishes of units smaller than a company in size.

This is part of the more comprehensive List of World War II Battles.

1940
 June 15–17: First Battle of the Camps (Also known as Battle of the Marmaric)
 September 9–16: Italian invasion of Egypt (Operation E)
 Dec. 9 – 9 Feb. 1942 Operation Compass
 Dec. 9: Battle of Nibeiwa
 Dec. 10: Third Battle of Fort Capuzzo
 Dec. 20–21 March 1941: Siege of Giarabub

1941
 Operation Compass continued
 The Offensive Resumes
 January 3–5: First Battle of Bardia
 January 9–26: First Battle of Tobruk
 January 25: First Battle of Mechili
 January 24–26: Battle of Derna
 February 5: Fall of Benghazi
 February 5–7: Battle of Beda Fomm
 Operation Sunflower
 March 21–23: Battle of the Oasis
 March 24: First Battle of El Agheila
 April 6–8: Second Battle Mechili
 April 10 - November 27: Siege of Tobruk
 April 12: Second Battle of Bardia
 April 12: First Battle of Sollum
 April 12: Fourth Battle of Fort Capuzzo
 April 30: First Battle of Halfaya Pass
 Operation Brevity
 May 15: Second Battle of Halfaya Pass
 May 15–16: Fifth Battle of Fort Capuzzo
 Operation Skorpion
 May 27: Third Battle of Halfaya Pass
 Operation Battleaxe
 June 15–17: Fourth Battle of Halfaya Pass
 June 15: Battle for Point 206
 June 15–16: Battle for Hafid Ridge
 June 15–16: Sixth Battle of Fort Capuzzo
 June 16: Battle of Sidi Omar
 June 17: Battle of Sidi Suleiman
 Operation Crusader
 November 19: first action at Bir el Gubi
 November 19 - December 1: Battle of Sidi Rezegh (known by the Germans as "de Salis Ridge")
 November 21 – December 7: Second Battle of Tobruk
 November 21: Battle of Bir el Haiad
 November 22: Battle of Bir Ghirba
 November 22: Second Battle of Sidi Omar
 November 27: Battle of Bir el Chleta
 November 29 - December 4: Battle of Ed Dedu
 November 29 - December 1: Battle of Belhamed
 December 1: Battle of Zaafran
 December 2: Battle of Belhamed Road
 December 3–7: second action at Bir el Gubi
 December 11–27: First Battle of Cyrenaica Line
 December 13: Battle of Alem Hamza
 December 13–14: Battle of Point 204
 December 23: Battle of Antelat
 December 23: Second Battle of Beda Fomm

1942
 Operation Crusader continued
 January 2: Battle of Bardia
 January 12: Third Battle of Sollum
 Operation Theseus
 January 21: Second Battle of El Agheila
 January 23: Second Battle of Cyrenaica Line
 January 28: Second Battle of Benghazi
Battle of Gazala
 May 27: Battle of Retma Box
 "The Cauldron"
 May 27 – June 12: Battle of El Adem
 May 28- June 10: Battle of Bir Hakeim
 May 31: Battle of 150th Brigade Box
 June 13: Battle of Knightsbridge
 June 15: Battle of Point 650
 June 20: Fall of Tobruk
 Operation Aida
 June 26–28: Battle of Mersa Matruh
 June 28: Battle of Fuka
 June 30: Battle of the El Alamein Box
July 1-27: First Battle of El Alamein
 July 1–2: First Battle of the Coast Road
 July 1: Battle of Deir el Shein
 July 2: First Battle of Ruweisat Ridge
 July 3–5: Battle of the Qattara box (Also known as Battle of the Kaponga box)
 July 10: First Battle of Tel el Eisa
 July 14: Second Battle of Ruweisat Ridge
 July 14: Second Battle of Tel el Eisa
 July 22: Third Battle of Ruweisat Ridge
 July 27: Third Battle of Tel el Eisa
 July 27: Battle of Miteiriya Ridge
 August 30 – September 2: Battle of Alam el Halfa
 September 2: Battle of Himeimat
 Second Battle of El Alamein
 October 23–28: Operation Lightfoot
 October 23–25: Battle of the Oxalic Line
 October 23: Fourth Battle of Ruweisat Ridge
 October 24–26: Battle of Kidney Ridge
 October 25: Fourth Battle of Tell el Eisa
 October 25–26: Battle of Point 29
 October 26–28: The German Counter Attack
 October 27: Battle of Position Snipe
 October 28 - November 1: Battle of Thompson's Post
 November 1–2: Operation Supercharge
 November 2: Battle of Tell el Aqqaqir
 November 2–4: Battle of Sidi Abdel Rahman
 November 2: Battle of Himeimat
 Operation Torch
 November 8–16 Battle of Casablanca
 November 8–10: Operation Blackstone
 November 8–10: Operation Brushwood
 November 8–10: Operation Goalpost
 November 8: Battle of Arzew
 November 8: Operation Reservist
 November 8: Battle of Tafarquay Airfield
 November 8: Battle of Youk-Les-Bains Airfield
 November 8: Battle of Algiers
 November 8: Operation Terminal
 Operation Supercharge continued
 November 7: Battle of Marsa Matruh
 November 9: Battle of Sidi Barrani
 November 9: Third Battle of Halfaya Pass
 November 13:Battle of Agedabia
 November 13: Third Battle of Torbuk
 November 17 - Nov. 26: Battle of Djebel Abiod
 November 20: Second Battle of Benghazi
 December 12: Second Battle of the Coast Road
 December14–16: Second Battle of El Agheila
 December 15: Battle of Wadi Zem Zem (or Buerat)
 December 25: Battle of Sirte
 Tunisia campaign
 November 24: First Battle of Medjez
 November 24: First Battle of Djedeida Airfield]
 November 26: Battle of Djebel Abiod
 November 27: Second Battle of Medjez
 November 28: Second Battle of Djedeida Airfield
 December 1: First Battle of Tebourba
 December 2–3: First Battle of Faid Pass
 December 16–17: Battle of Maknassy
 December 22–23: Battle of Longstop Hill
 December 22–25: Second Battle of Tebourba

1943
 Eighth Army Offensive continued
 Jan. 23: Battle of Tripoli
 Tunisian Campaign continued
 January 14: Battle of Faïd Pass
 February 14–17: Battle of Sidi Bou Zid
 February 19–24: Battle of Kasserine Pass
 February 26 - March 4: Operation Ochsenkopf (Ox Head)
 March 6: Operation Capri
 March 6: Battle of Medenine
 March 16–27: Operation Pugilist
 March 16–23: Battle of Mareth
 March 23 – April 7: Battle of El Guettar
 March 26–28: Operation Supercharge II
 March 26: Battle of Tebaga Gap
 April 6: Battle of Wadi Akarit
 April 22 – May 6: Operation Vulcan
 Battle of Longstop Hill (1943)
 May 6–13: Operation Strike

Footnotes

References

 
 

Battles, List of